MEX (Multiple EXposure) was a windowing system created by Silicon Graphics, used on 68k-based IRIS systems and early IRIS 4D systems. MEX was originally loaded over a network through the utilization of GL1 routines kept on a remote host machine, usually a VAX. When the IRIS 1400 workstation and GL2-W (IRIX) were introduced, MEX was allowed to run locally.  MEX was used in IRIX from the GL2-W2.1.0 release to the 4D1-2.3 release.

With the introduction of 4D1-3.0 (IRIX 3.0), and the complete migration to MIPS processors, support for the GL / GL2 powered MEX ended in the late 1980s, replaced by Sun Microsystems' NeWS and the 4Sight window manager.

References 

Computer-related introductions in 1985
Windowing systems
SGI graphics